"Swimming in the Stars" is a song recorded by American singer Britney Spears for her ninth studio album, Glory (2016). It was written by Matthew Koma, Dan Book, and Alexei Misoul in 2015, and was not released during the initial release of the album; the track only appears on its 2020 deluxe reissue. The song was met with positive reception by critics.

"Swimming in the Stars" became available for pre-order as part of the Urban Outfitters's "11/11 Singles Day" promotion as an exclusive 12-inch vinyl single on November 11, 2020. It was released to digital music providers on December 2, 2020 as the fourth single from Glory, coinciding with Spears's 39th birthday. "Swimming in the Stars" peaked at number three in Malaysia and within the top 20 in Hungary.

Background and composition

"Swimming in the Stars" was written by Matthew Koma, Dan Book, and Alexei Misoul in 2015 when Koma revealed he had been working with Spears though his tracks never made it on to the initial release of the album. During an interview with PopCrush, Koma said that Spears is "extremely talented" and is "super surreal to sit there and hear [her] sing one of your songs". The song was recorded in 2016.

"Swimming in the Stars" is an electropop ballad containing a synth-laden groove. The song contains optimistic and catchy lyrics with dreamy escapism spread throughout its chorus. According to Jenzia Burgos of StyleCaster, the song is reminiscent of Spears's interest in astrology, with giving an example of the song's bridge, where she is singing about her sister zodiac sign: "What if we could float here forever? / In these Gemini dreams together".

Release
Following the #JusticeForGlory campaign that was launched by Spears's fans on social media during the COVID-19 pandemic, the singer unveiled a new cover art for Glory on May 8, 2020, nearly four years after its release. Three weeks later, Spears announced that "Mood Ring" would be released worldwide on all streaming and download platforms the next day, on May 29, 2020. Later that year, "Swimming in the Stars" was unveiled since it became available for pre-order as part of the Urban Outfitters's "11/11 Singles Day" promotion as an exclusive 12-inch vinyl single on November 11, 2020; however, orders would not ship until January 15, 2021. The release took critics by surprise, having been released amidst the #FreeBritney movement and Spears's work hiatus. After the announcement of the song's vinyl release, a 12-seconds long snippet was released by Urban Outfitters via Instagram.

"Swimming in the Stars" was released to digital download and streaming media on December 2, 2020 as the fourth single from Glory, coinciding with Spears's 39th birthday. Two days later, the track was included on the 2020 deluxe physical reissue of Glory with "Mood Ring" and "Matches". On the single cover, Spears crouches on one knee in the sand next to broken chains, wearing gold crop top and high-low sarong skirt, which were made of the same material as her bracelets and shoes. She is set to be on desert oasis. On the day of release, a visualiser to the song was published on Spears's YouTube channel, featuring the single cover with animated soft waves and glistering stars behind the singer. Brea Cubit from PopSugar called the visualizer "mesmorizing".

Critical reception
Upon release, "Swimming in the Stars" received critical acclaim. Lake Schatz of Consequence of Sound described the lyrics of "Swimming in the Stars" as "positive", since they are talking about "briefly forgetting our worries and holding onto joy". Jon Blistein of Rolling Stone wrote that the song "boasts a big drum pop groove, which anchors a wash of atmospheric synths and Spears' unmistakable vocals as she croons". Writing for Vulture.com, Rebecca Alter said that "Swimming in the Stars" has "big liquid-stardust, shimmery, synth-y sound perfect for stargazing when it gets dark at like 2PM". Gary Dinges from USA Today stated that the song is "classic Britney" and contains "catchy lyrics". Mike Wass from Idolator called the song an "absolute gem" and described its chorus as "sweeping". In The Musical Hype, "Swimming in the Stars" was named a "well-produced record with a relatable theme", where Matthew Koma's production was described as "lush, sleek, and smooth".

Idolator ranked the song at number 15 on their list of 100 best pop songs of 2020.

Commercial performance
Due to not receiving any substantial promotion, "Swimming in the Stars" did not spawn huge commercial success, charting mostly on component charts. It peaked at number 25 on the Canadian Digital Song Sales, 28 on Germany Digital Song Sales, 36 on UK Download Chart and 18 on the US Digital Song Sales chart. However, the song managed to peak at number three on Malaysia's RIM chart and number 13 on the Hungary Singles Sales chart. Additionally, the song also charted at number 96 on the Croatian Airplay chart.

Credits and personnel
Personnel
 Britney Spears – lead vocals
 Klara Elias – background vocals
 Matthew Koma – songwriting, production, record engineering
 Dan Book – songwriting
 Alexei Misoul – songwriting
 Emily Wright – vocal production
 Rachael Findlen – assistant engineer
 Adam Hawkins – mixing
 Dave Kutch – mastering

Design
 Gavin Taylor – art direction, design
 David LaChapelle – photography

Charts

Release history

References

Britney Spears songs
2020s ballads
2020 singles
2020 songs
Songs written by Dan Book
Songs written by Matthew Koma
Electropop ballads